Pobedilovo Airport  is an airport in Russia located 22 km southwest of Kirov. It handles small airliner traffic.

Airlines and destinations

Gallery

External links
Pobedilovo Airport Official site

References

Airports built in the Soviet Union
Airports in Kirov Oblast